Dianzi is a town in Guan County, Liaocheng, in western Shandong province, China.

References

Township-level divisions of Shandong